Paulo Leminski Filho (August 24, 1944 – June 7, 1989) was a Brazilian writer, poet, translator, journalist, advertising professional, songwriter, literary critic, biographer, teacher and judoka. He was noted for his avant-garde work, an experimental novel and poetry inspired in concrete poetry, as well as abundant short lyrics derived from haiku and related forms. He had a remarkable poetry, as he invented his own way of writing, with puns, jokes with popular sayings and the influence of haiku, in addition to abusing slangs and profanity.

Biography
Leminski was born in Curitiba, in the Brazilian state of Paraná, in 1944. His father, Paulo Leminski, was of Polish descent, and his mother, Áurea Pereira Mendes, was of Portuguese, Afro-Brazilian and indigenous descent. In 1958, Leminski was sent to the Mosteiro de São Bento in São Paulo, where he stayed for a year. There he studied latin, theology, philosophy and classic literature. Leminski wanted to be a monk, being against his father's wishes, who wanted his son to become a serviceman like him. Leminski abandoned his religious vocations in 1963.

During the First Congress of Brazilian Experimental Poetry in Belo Horizonte, Minas Gerais, he met Haroldo de Campos, who would become one of his long-time friends and major influences.

In 1963 he officially married Nevair "Neiva" Maria de Sousa, a plastic artist. They divorced in 1968.

In 1964 he published his first poems in the arts journal Invenção, founded by Décio Pignatari, Haroldo de Campos and his brother Augusto. In 1965 he became a history and creative writing teacher, even though he had never finished college. He became the most famous teacher in Curitiba because of his way of teaching. This experience motivated him to write his book Catatau. He was also an expert judo sensei.

In 1968 he married for the second time, this time with fellow poet Alice Ruiz. They had three children: Miguel Ângelo (who died prematurely due to a lymphoma), Aurea Alice and Estrela Leminski, who would also become a poet, artist and musician. He moved temporarily to Rio de Janeiro in 1969, returning to Curitiba in the following year.

In 1970 he published in various magazines, such as Qorpo Estranho, Muda Código and Raposa.

In the late 1970s, in the publishing house Grafipar, located in Curitiba, Alice and Leminski scripted erotic comic books, drawn by artists such as Claudio Seto, Júlio Shimamoto, Flávio Colin and Itamar Gonçalves.

Leminski was a polyglot; he knew French, English, Spanish, Japanese, Latin and Greek.

In 1988, after a 20-year marriage, Leminski divorced Alice Ruiz, with whom he was working on his last poetry book, the exquisite La vie en close, which appeared posthumously in 1991.

Leminski died on June 7, 1989, of liver cirrhosis, from which he had suffered for years.

Leminski had many musical partners in life such as Moraes Moreira, Itamar Assumpção, Ivo Rodrigues and Guilherme Arantes. His compositions was sung by names such as Caetano Veloso, Ney Matogrosso, the group A Cor do Som,  Paulinho Boca de Cantor, Zizi Possi, Zélia Duncan, Gilberto Gil, Ângela Maria, Ná Ozzetti, Arnaldo Antunes and Vítor Ramil. Gilberto Gil honored one of Leminski's daughters with the song Estrela. Estrela Leminski had published in 2014 an album called Leminskanções with 25 songs composed by her father and one song book, registering around 109 compositions by Leminski.

Leminski was a trotskyist and was close to the Organização Socialista Internacionalista, a trotskyist organization put in the situation of clandestinity by the Brazilian military dictatorship. In a poem dedicated to the Liberdade e Luta organization (Libelu), an organization formed in the University of São Paulo to combat the military dictatorship, he wrote that the "trotskyists were the ones power did not corrupt".

Leminski had a major Japanese influence through his life and writing, such as Zen Buddhism, haiku, and judo. A vanguardist poet, Leminski is also considered a poeta marginal ("marginal poet") for his extensive publications in magazines and fanzines. He has influenced all Brazilian literary movements in the last 30 years.

Literary works
In 1975, his first romance and major work, Catatau, was published. It took 8 years to be completely written. It is an experimental novel, written in prose poetry, dealing with an imaginary visit of philosopher René Descartes to Brazil alongside Prince John Maurice of Nassau during the Dutch invasions of Brazil in the 17th century. Catatau would draw the attention of some of the most important cultural personalities of the time, such as Caetano Veloso, Gilberto Gil, Tom Zé and Moraes Moreira.

In 1976 he published a photo-book in partnership with the photographer Jack Pires called Quarenta clics em Curitiba. It consists of 40 black-and-white photographs and 40 poems.

In 1980, with initiative of friends, Não fosse isso e era menos não fosse tanto e era quase was published. In the same year, Polonaises was published. These two books together with other poems would form the book Caprichos e relaxos, published in 1983.

Also in 1980, Leminski published Tripas, a book vastly unknown by both the critics and the public.

Between 1984 and 1986, he translated into Portuguese works by Petronius, John Fante, Alfred Jarry, James Joyce, Samuel Beckett and Yukio Mishima. An enthusiast of the culture of Japan, Leminski wrote a biography of the famous 17th-century haiku poet Matsuo Bashō in 1983. He also authored in the 1980s biographies of Leon Trotsky, João da Cruz e Sousa and Jesus Christ. The biography of Jesus has translations of gospels, and the biography of Matsuo Bashō has translations of his haiku, together with excerpts of his diaries and other haiku written by eastern and western authors.

In 1984, he publishes his second romance, Agora é que são elas. In 1985, he publishes Hai Tropikais, in partnership with Alice Ruiz. In 1986, he publishes his first children's book, Guerra dentro da gente. 1986 is also the year he published his last translation, Malone Morre (Malone Dies), by Samuel Beckett, and his last biography, Trotsky. In 1987 was published his last book in life, Distraídos venceremos.

In 1989, after his death, his children's poetry A lua no cinema was published.

Other posthumously published books include La vie en close (1991), Winterverno (with João Suplicy, 1994), Metaformose: uma viagem pelo imaginário grego (1994), which won the Prêmio Jabuti prize in 1995 in the poetry category in 3rd place, O ex-estranho (1996), Gozo fabuloso (2004) and Toda Poesia (2013), a collection of his complete poetic works and a best-seller. It has sold over 200,000 copies and has been prepared an English translation for publication in 2022.

References

External links
 Fundação Paulo Leminski 
 pauloleminski.com
 leminski.com.br
 KAMIQUASE: PAULO LEMINSKI
 Poems by Leminski translated into English and Spanish
 Translations by Charles A. Perrone, Chris Daniels and others
 Leminskanções by Estrela Ruiz, full album

1944 births
1989 deaths
Brazilian male judoka
20th-century Brazilian poets
Brazilian male poets
Brazilian translators
Brazilian biographers
Brazilian people of Polish descent
Brazilian people of Portuguese descent
Brazilian people of indigenous peoples descent
People from Curitiba
Portuguese-language writers
Translators to Portuguese
English–Portuguese translators
French–Portuguese translators
Latin–Portuguese translators
Deaths from cirrhosis
20th-century translators
20th-century biographers
20th-century Brazilian male writers
Male biographers